Kaiko (possibly Quechua for a type of hunt) is a  mountain in the Vilcabamba mountain range in the Andes of Peru. It is situated in the Cusco Region, La Convención Province, on the border of the districts of Santa Teresa and Vilcabamba. Kaiko lies northeast of Choquetacarpo and northwest of Pumasillo.

References

Mountains of Peru
Mountains of Cusco Region